St. Raphael the Archangel is a former Roman Catholic parish in the Outremont neighbourhood of Montreal, Quebec, Canada. It was founded in 1930 for the English-speaking Catholic community of Outremont under the Archdiocese of Montreal. In 1932, the parish built a small Gothic Revival parish church with the same name.

By 2008, after more than 75 years in existence, the parish was forced to close due to the decline in the English-speaking population in the area. It was the last English-speaking Catholic parish in Outremont.

As of 2014, a group is planning to convert the church into a palliative care facility.

References

Outremont, Quebec
Gothic Revival architecture in Montreal
Roman Catholic churches completed in 1932
R
Raphael the Archangel
Quebec Anglophone culture in Montreal
Gothic Revival church buildings in Canada
Christian organizations established in 1930
Organizations disestablished in 2008
20th-century Roman Catholic church buildings in Canada